The Hsuehshan Tunnel is the longest tunnel in Taiwan, located on the National Freeway 5. It opened on June 16, 2006.

Overview
The tunnels are bored through the Hsuehshan Range. The road connects Taipei through New Taipei to Yilan County, cutting down the journey time from two hours to just half an hour. It bypasses the rural district of Pinglin, which used to receive high traffic prior to the completion of the tunnel. One of the key aims of constructing the tunnel was to connect the western coast of Taiwan, where 95% of the population lives, to the eastern coast of the island and in doing so tackle the unbalanced development on the island. It is constructed with one pilot tunnel and two main tunnels for eastbound and westbound traffic. The tunnel opened in June 2006 to severe traffic jams.

Tunnel Construction
Tunnel construction began in July 1991 and took 15 years to complete and cost a total of NT$90.6 billion (US$2.83 billion) to complete. Tunnel construction used  of concrete,  of cables, and 2,000 lighting units.

While excavating the tunnel, engineers encountered difficult geological problems such as fractured rock and massive inflows of water, which caused severe delays. One of the three TBMs on the westbound tunnel was buried by a ground collapse. In order to speed up the tunnel boring, an additional working interface in Interchange Station No. 2 (under Ventilation Shaft No. 2) was built. Along the tunnel alignment, there are six major faults, ninety-eight fracture zones, and thirty six high-pressure groundwater sources. Hence, serious tunnel collapses with groundwater flooding took place periodically during tunnel construction. Altogether, 25 people died during 15 years of construction.

Operations
When traveling through the Hsuehshan Tunnel, vehicles must not exceed the  limit; otherwise the drivers face a NT$3,000 (US$93.75) to NT$6,000 (US$187.5) fine. The usual minimum speed limit is 70 km/h. Additionally vehicles must maintain a separation distance of  under normal situations. Even when the speed is less than  due to congestion, a separation distance of  must still be maintained. Double solid lines prohibit lane changes. Automated road-rule enforcement cameras are used to monitor speeders, tailgaters, and those who unlawfully change lanes. Announcements of zero tolerance of speeding meant that those traveling at 71 km/h would be fined. After creating controversies, effective 00:00 (UTC+8) on September 16, 2006, a tolerance of 10 km/h has been allowed so speeds up to 80 km/h are no longer automatically penalized.

The Hsuehshan Tunnel broadcasts a dedicated radio station on two FM channels inside the tunnel. Drivers can tune to either of the two FM stations to hear announcements regarding the Hsuehshan Tunnel, rules for driving inside the tunnel, and music.

As of May 1, 2008, the speed limit has been raised to 80 km/h with a 10 km/h tolerance. At this speed a trip through the 12.9 km tunnel takes 8.6 minutes.

As of Nov 1, 2010, the speed limit was raised to 90 km/h to allievate traffic

Tunnel information
 Tunnel length:
 Pilot tunnel: 
 Main tunnels:
 Southbound tunnel: 
 Northbound tunnel: 
 Constructed by: RSEA
 Design speed: 70 km/h (Operational speed limit was raised to 90 km/h)
 Location: Pinglin District, New Taipei City and Toucheng Township, Yilan County
 Ventilation shaft: 3
 Total cost: NT$18,555,000,000 (US$562,273,000)
 Date of groundbreaking:
 Pilot tunnel: July 1991
 Main tunnels: July 23, 1993
 Date of breakthrough:
 Pilot tunnel: October 2003
 Main tunnels:
 Southbound tunnel: September 2004
 Northbound tunnel: April 2004
 Date of opening: June 16, 2006

See also
Xueshan
Xueshan Range

References

External links

Xueshan Tunnel

2006 establishments in Taiwan
Road tunnels in Taiwan
Transportation in New Taipei
Transportation in Yilan County, Taiwan
Tunnels completed in 2006